Isidor Rayner (April 11, 1850November 25, 1912) was a Democratic member of the United States Senate, representing the State of Maryland from 1905 to 1912. He also represented the Fourth Congressional District of Maryland from 1887 to 1889, and 1891 to 1895.

Rayner was born into a German-Jewish family in Baltimore, Maryland, and attended local private schools. He later attended the University of Maryland, Baltimore, and the University of Virginia. He began to study law and was admitted to the Maryland bar in 1871.

Rayner was elected to the Maryland House of Delegates and served from 1878 to 1884. In 1885, he was elected to the Maryland State Senate, serving one year until 1886.

Rayner was elected the same year to the 50th United States Congress. He was an unsuccessful candidate for reelection in 1888 to the 51st Congress, but was victorious in the next two elections to the 52nd and 53rd Congresses. He declined to be a candidate for renomination in 1894.

Five years later in 1899, Rayner was chosen to be the Attorney General of Maryland, serving until 1903. He was elected as a Democrat in 1905 to the U.S. Senate, and was reelected again in 1911. While senator, he served as chairman of the Committee on Indian Depredations (Sixty-second Congress).

In 1912, Rayner died in Washington, D.C., while serving as senator. He is buried at Rock Creek Cemetery.

See also 
List of Jewish members of the United States Congress
List of United States Congress members who died in office (1900–49)

References

External links

 
 Isidor Rayner, late a senator from Maryland, Memorial addresses delivered in the House of Representatives and Senate frontispiece 1914

1850 births
1912 deaths
American people of German-Jewish descent
Democratic Party Maryland state senators
Maryland Attorneys General
Democratic Party members of the Maryland House of Delegates
Politicians from Baltimore
University of Maryland, Baltimore alumni
Jewish United States senators
Jewish members of the United States House of Representatives
Burials at Rock Creek Cemetery
Democratic Party United States senators from Maryland
Democratic Party members of the United States House of Representatives from Maryland
19th-century American politicians
20th-century American politicians